Teerawat Homklin (born 13 October 1987 in Bangkok, Thailand) is a Thai judoka. He competed at the 2012 Summer Olympics in the -100 kg event.

References 

1987 births
Living people
Teerawat Homklin
Teerawat Homklin
Judoka at the 2012 Summer Olympics
Teerawat Homklin